Yangi Nishon is a city in Nishon District of Qashqadaryo Region in Uzbekistan. It is the administrative center of Nishon District. Its population was 9,800 in 2003, and 13,300 in 2016.

References

Populated places in Qashqadaryo Region
Cities in Uzbekistan